Pink Season is the debut Japanese album by the South Korean girl group Apink, and was released by Universal Music Japan on August 26, 2015.

Background and release
After releasing three singles in the Japanese market, including Limited Edition "No No No", "Mr. Chu", and "Luv", Apink released their first Japanese studio album Pink Season on August 26, 2015.

Editions
The album was originally released in three different editions: Limited Edition A, Limited Edition B, and the Regular Edition.

Singles
"No No No" is the first title track and the debut song in Japanese. The single was the first ever Japanese single released by A Pink on October 22, 2014 in Japan. A new version of the music video was filmed to accompany the Japanese version, and the teaser was released on September 29, 2014. On September 30, 2015, the full music video was released.

Apink also released their second Japanese single "Mr. Chu" on February 18, 2015. They releases the music video teaser on January 21, 2015. The full music video was released on January 22, 2015.

The last single before the album "Luv" was released on May 20, 2015. The music video teaser was released on April 15, 2015. The full music video was released on April 16, 2015.

Track listing

Charts

Release history

References

External links
 

2015 debut albums
Apink albums
Universal Music Japan albums
Japanese-language albums
Cube Entertainment albums